Cheremisinovsky District is an administrative and municipal district (raion), one of the twenty-eight in Kursk Oblast, Russia. It is located in the northeast of the oblast. Its administrative center is the urban locality (a work settlement) of Cheremisinovo. Population:  12,431 (2002 Census);  The population of Cheremisinovo accounts for 43.1% of the district's population.

Geography
Cheremisinovsky District is located in the north-east of Kursk Oblast, on the border with Oryol Oblast.   The terrain is hilly plain averaging 200 meters above sea level; the district lies on the Orel-Kursk plateau of the Central Russian Upland.  The district is 60 km northeast of the city of Kursk, and 480 km south of Moscow.  The area measures 37 km (north-south), and 27 km (west-east).  The administrative center is the town of  Cheremisinovo.

The district is bordered on the north by Dolzhansky District of Oryol Oblast, on the east by Sovetsky District, Kursk Oblast, on the south by Timsky District, and on the west by Shchigrovsky District.

References

Notes

Sources

External links
Cheremisinovsky District on Google Maps
Cheremisinovsky District on OpenStreetMap

Districts of Kursk Oblast